The 1948/49 NTFL season was the 28th season of the Northern Territory Football League (NTFL).

Buffaloes have won their ninth premiership title while defeating the Wanderers in the grand final by 46 points.

Grand Final

References 

Northern Territory Football League seasons
NTFL